Eustalodes anthivora is a moth in the family Gelechiidae. It was described by Clarke in 1954. It is found in the Philippines.

The larvae feed on Achras sapota. They feed on the flowers, causing them to drop.

References

Chelariini
Moths described in 1954
Insects of the Philippines